Unciherpia is a genus of cavibelonian solenogasters, shell-less, worm-like, marine  mollusks.

References

Cavibelonia